Backroads Pragmatists: Mexico's Melting Pot and Civil Rights in the United States is a history book by Ruben Flores about the connection between post-revolutionary Mexico and the American Civil Rights Movement. University of Pennsylvania Press published the book in 2014. It won the Society for U.S. Intellectual History Book Award the next year.

References

External links 

 
 Interview with New Books Network

2014 non-fiction books
University of Pennsylvania Press books
History books about Mexico
History books about the United States
Civil rights movement
Mexican Revolution
English-language books